Luis Helguera Bujía (born 9 June 1976) is a Spanish retired footballer who played as a midfielder.

Club career
Helguera was born in Ferrol, Galicia. After beginning with lowly Club Deportivo Manchego he moved to La Liga with Real Zaragoza, where he appeared sporadically (his most games being 16 in 1999–2000, as the Aragon side finished fourth).

After his older brother, Iván, had played one season at A.S. Roma, Helguera also moved to Italy, representing Udinese Calcio for two years with a Deportivo Alavés loan in between. He spent a further six campaigns also in that country, mostly in Serie B, returning in 2008 to his homeland to sign with a second division newcomer, SD Huesca.

Helguera rarely missed a game for the club during his spell, helping it consecutively retain its status. In 2010–11 he also collected a season-worse 20 yellow cards, in 37 matches. He retired in June 2013 at the age of 37 following the team's relegation, amassing second-tier totals of 185 appearances and eight goals over the course of five seasons.

Later career

SD Huesca
After retiring in the summer 2013, Helguera was hired to the sporting management of SD Huesca, and also as an umpire for the club. In October 2013, he was also added to the technical staff of David Amaral as an assistant coach, beside his other roles.

Helguera stepped down from the assistant coach role in March 2014 when David Amaral left the club, but continued in his other roles. On 20 May 2014, he was officially appointed sporting director of Huesca. He left Huesca in the summer 2015.

Las Palmas
On 6 August 2015, Helguera was named UD Las Palmas' technical secretary. Helguera resigned from the position on 27 April 2018.

Levante
On 21 May 2018, Helguera joined UD Levante in a similar role as in Las Palmas as a technical secretary. He left the position a year later in May 2019.

Return to Las Palmas
On 2 March 2020, Helguera returned to UD Las Palmas, however, this time as the clubs new sporting director. He signed a deal until June 2023.

Personal life
Helguera was the younger brother of former Real Madrid, Valencia and Spain defender Iván Helguera. Both played abroad in Italy.

References

External links

1976 births
Living people
Spanish footballers
Footballers from Ferrol, Spain
Association football midfielders
La Liga players
Segunda División players
Segunda División B players
Tercera División players
Real Zaragoza B players
Real Zaragoza players
Deportivo Alavés players
SD Huesca footballers
Serie A players
Serie B players
Udinese Calcio players
ACF Fiorentina players
A.C. Ancona players
L.R. Vicenza players
Spanish expatriate footballers
Expatriate footballers in Italy
Spanish expatriate sportspeople in Italy